WOW Gold was released in 2000 and is part of the WOW series. It was a landmark two-album collection of thirty contemporary Christian music hits ranging from the 1970s to the time it was released. Marketing and distribution responsibilities for this title in the WOW series was relegated to Brentwood Records, part of the Provident Label Group. The compilation reached No. 111 on the Billboard 200 chart in 2000, and No. 3 on the Top Contemporary Christian album chart.  Album sales were certified as gold in the US in 2000 by the Recording Industry Association of America (RIAA).

Track listings and artists

Disc one

Disc two

References

External links 
 Amazon.com.  Retrieved March 21, 2007.

WOW series albums
2000 compilation albums